Mickey's Luck is a 1930 short film in Larry Darmour's Mickey McGuire series starring a young Mickey Rooney. Directed by Albert Herman, the two-reel short was released to theaters on March 30, 1930 by RKO.

Premise
Mickey and the Gang form their own fire department in order to partake in a parade. Later, the children attempt to rescue a pet shop from a fire.

Cast
Mickey Rooney - Mickey McGuire
Billy Barty - Billy McGuire
Jimmy Robinson - Hambone Johnson
Delia Bogard - Tomboy Taylor
Marvin Stephens - Katrink
Douglas Fox - Stinkie Davis
Spencer Bell - Actor rehearsing for play

External links 
 

1930 films
1930 comedy films
American black-and-white films
Mickey McGuire short film series
1930 short films
American comedy short films
1930s English-language films
1930s American films